Shamberg is a surname. Notable people with the surname include:

Michael Shamberg (born  1945), American film producer and writer
Michael H. Shamberg (1952–2014), American music video producer and filmmaker

See also
Samberg
Schamberg disease
Schomberg (disambiguation)